Ofjord (meaning 'Island Fjord') is a fjord in King Christian X Land, eastern Greenland.
This fjord is part of the Scoresby Sound system. Administratively it lies in the area of Sermersooq municipality.

History
The Øfjord was named in 1891 by Carl Ryder during his 1891–92 East Greenland Expedition owing to the islands on the southern side of its mouth.

The Greenlandic name Ikaasakajik ("the bad sound") originated in a 1955 name registration by the Geodetical Institute of Denmark (Geodætisk Institut). The name makes reference to the persistent katabatic winds blowing along the fjord.

Geography

From its mouth near the Bjorne Islands this fjord runs in a roughly NE/SW direction for about  until it bends and runs in a slightly more east–west direction for a further . About  before the confluence there is a sound branching on its southern shore towards the southwest, the Snesund. Further west the Rype Fjord branches to the northwest, the Hare Fjord continues in a westerly direction and the Rode Fjord (Røde Fjord) branches towards the south.

To the northeast the fjord is bound by Renland, a peninsula attached to the mainland, and to the south by the island of Milne Land. The island of Storo lies on the NW side of the Snesund.

See also
List of fjords of Greenland

References

External links

Holocene glacimarine sedimentation, inner Scoresby Sund
Øfjord and Bjørneøer islands
Fjords of Greenland
Scoresby Sound